Neurolakis is a genus of flowering plants in the Ironweed tribe within the daisy family.

Species
The only known species is Neurolakis modesta, native to Cameroon in tropical Africa.

References

Flora of Cameroon
Monotypic Asteraceae genera
Vernonieae